Balıklı is a village in the Çayırlı District, Erzincan Province, Turkey. The village is populated by Bosnians, Kurds and Turks and had a population of 166 in 2021.

References 

Villages in Çayırlı District

Kurdish settlements in Erzincan Province